Apasionada may refer to:

Apasionada (Mexican TV series), Mexican telenovela 1964
Apasionada (Argentine TV series), Argentine telenovela 1993
Apasionada (album), an album by Ednita Nazario 
Apasionada, a 1992 album by flautist Jane Rutter

See also
Apasionado (disambiguation)
Appassionata (disambiguation)